The 2003 Welwyn Hatfield District Council election took place on 1 May 2003 to elect members of Welwyn Hatfield District Council in Hertfordshire, England. One third of the council was up for election and the Conservative Party stayed in overall control of the council.

After the election, the composition of the council was:
Conservative 27
Labour 20
Vacant 1

Election result
The results saw the Conservatives increase their majority on the council after making one gain from Labour in Hatfield West. No other seats changed parties, with the Conservatives holding Sherrards by 123 votes over Labour. The closest result came in Handside ward where the Conservatives held the seat by 20 votes over the Liberal Democrats, meaning that the Liberal Democrats remained without any seats on the council. Overall turnout in the election was 33.1%, down by 2% from the 2002 election, with a quarter of the votes cast being postal votes.

Ward results

References

2003
2003 English local elections
2000s in Hertfordshire